Anu Partanen (born 1975) is a Finnish journalist living in the United States. She became a naturalized American citizen in 2013. Her book The Nordic Theory of Everything: In Search of a Better Life was published in June 2016 by HarperCollins.

In March 2016, Partanen's article "What Americans Don't Get About Nordic Countries" was published in The Atlantic. The article was shared 130,000 times on Facebook in six days. Partanen has also written for The New York Times and Helsingin Sanomat. Before she moved to the United States, she performed as a regular commentator on a journalist's panel discussion program on Yle TV2.

Partanen is married to American writer Trevor Corson.

References

External links

Bernie Sanders on Twitter: "Take a look at what Finland, the happiest country in the world, is doing." 27.4.2018.

Finnish journalists
American women journalists
1975 births
Living people
Naturalized citizens of the United States
Place of birth missing (living people)
Finnish emigrants to the United States
21st-century American women